Yngve Karlsson (born 10 February 1929) is a Swedish retired ice hockey player. Karlsson was part of the Djurgården Swedish champions' team of 1950, 1954, 1955, 1958, and 1962.

References

1929 births
Djurgårdens IF Hockey players
Possibly living people
Swedish ice hockey players